Organic Valley (OV) is an organic food brand and independent cooperative of organic farmers based in La Farge, Wisconsin, United States. Founded in 1988, Organic Valley is the nation’s largest farmer-owned organic cooperative and one of the world's largest organic consumer brands.

Organic Valley markets products such as milk, cheese, eggs, soy, protein shakes, butter, yogurt, organic snack items, and more. Under the Organic Prairie brand, the cooperative markets organic beef, pork, chicken, and turkey products. With 1,800 farmer-owners across the United States, Canada, Australia, and the United Kingdom, Organic Valley markets its products in all 50 states and exports to 25 countries.

Cooperative history

Organic Valley was founded in 1988 under the name 'CROPP (Coulee Region Organic Produce Pool) Cooperative. What began as a group of Wisconsin family farms selling their produce soon expanded into the production and local distribution of vegetables, and dairy products. The brand name "Organic Valley" was soon adopted, and the abbreviation "CROPP" was adjusted to Cooperative Regions of Organic Producer Pools. The original CROPP farms were located throughout southwest Wisconsin, primarily in the Kickapoo River Basin area near the cooperative's headquarters which was built in 2004.

Organic Valley comprises nearly 2,000 farmer-owners located in the United States, Canada, Australia, and the United Kingdom that specialize in sustainable, organic agriculture practices. Organic Valley has become the world's largest independent Cooperative of organic family farmers and one of the nation's largest producers and distributors of organic produce, dairy, soy, and eggs. It also markets its line of beef, pork, turkey, and chicken products under the Organic Prairie brand.

Products are marketed in all 50 states, Canada, China, Japan, and 22 other countries. The United States is divided into three selling markets: the Western, Central, and Eastern Divisions. Each division is managed by sales staff, producers, and distributors directly associated with the cooperative. Organic Valley produces six regional milks that are produced, processed and distributed in New England, Northeast, Heartland, Rocky Mountain, California, and the Pacific Northwest.

In 2009, Organic Valley launched a partnership with Stonyfield Farm and HP Hood agreeing to license the Stonyfield fluid milk brand, and manage sales and distribution. The deal also invited the farmers supplying that milk into the cooperative starting January 1, 2010.

In March 2016, construction was completed on a second 200,000 square foot office building on the Cashton campus in order to accommodate continued growth of the organization. The building is large enough to accommodate roughly half of the cooperative's total employees. Organic Valley's original headquarter building remains in La Farge, approximately twenty minutes east.

Ahead of the 2016 Summer Olympics, Organic Valley announced its sponsorship of Team USA cyclist Kristin Armstrong, one of the most decorated women cyclists in the world. The cooperative also created new packaging for its white milk half-gallons and Good to Go single-serves featuring the Milk Life Team USA logo.

Organic Valley purchased Farmers Cooperative Creamery in McMinnville, Oregon 2016. It merges 72 co-op members in Oregon and Washington. In 2021, a massive 3-alarm fire decimated the McMinnville Creamery forcing residents to evacuate a 1/2 mile radius. In response McMinnville School District evacuated all buildings throughout the entire city and remained closed for a second day out of an abundance of caution.

In March 2017, Organic Valley announced the creation of Organic Valley Fresh, a 50:50 joint venture with Dean Foods to expand the brand's presence by leveraging Dean Foods' extensive distribution network. Later that year, the organization opened a new 23,000 square foot CALF (Conversion & Labeling Facility) building on the Cashton campus to accommodate growth of producing, cutting, packing, and labeling products.

In 2019, total annual sales for Organic Valley reached an estimated $1.1 billion. However, milk supply and demand issues along with shifting consumer taste resulted in year-over-year profitability losses for the organization nearing $30 million in the latest 2019 earnings. Restructuring also led to a mixture of nearly 100 layoffs and retirements including the departure of 14 farmer-members.

Management 
George Siemon, one of the founding farmers of CROPP, was the CEO of Organic Valley for more than 30 years. Once a member of the National Organic Standards Board, Siemon helped set the standards not only for Organic Valley, but is best known for his leadership in organizing farmers and building market support for organic agriculture across the country.

In March 2019, Siemon stepped down as CEO and the board of directors selected Robert Kirchoff, former chief business officer, as interim CEO.

Sustainability 
In 2015, Organic Valley announced that 81% of the cooperative's combined on-site power consumption was generated by renewable energy. On-farm sustainability efforts and sustainable operations at the coop's offices and warehouses include solar, wind, biodiesel, and more. These efforts have placed the organization in the Top 30 On-site Generation list by the United States Environmental Protection Agency.

In 2017, Organic Valley announced it will be 100% powered by renewable energy in 2019 and will become the largest food company in the world to source all of its electricity from renewable sources.

References

External links
 Official website of Organic Valley
 Official website of Organic Prairie
 Official website of Organic Valley Fresh
 Official website of Organic Logistics

Agricultural marketing cooperatives
Organic farming organizations
Dairy products companies of the United States
1988 establishments in Wisconsin
Agriculture in Wisconsin
Food and drink companies based in Wisconsin
Vernon County, Wisconsin
Multinational food companies
Cooperatives in the United States
Agricultural cooperatives in the United States